Ellis Longstaff (born 5 July 2002) is a professional rugby league footballer who plays as a  forward for the Salford Red Devils in the Betfred Super League, on loan from the Warrington Wolves. He has played for the England Knights at international level.

He has previously spent time on loan from Warrington at the Newcastle Thunder in the Betfred Championship and Hull FC in the Super League.

Career
Longstaff is a product of the Elite Rugby Academy and is the first individual of the academy to go professional since its initial launch in 2012.

Longstaff has previously played for Kippax Welfare ARLFC and was part of the youth development program at the Wigan club.

Warrington Wolves
Longstaff made his Super League debut in round 11 of the 2020 Super League season for Warrington against Hull F.C.

Hull F.C.
During the 2022 Super League season, Longstaff joined Hull F.C. on a short-term loan deal.  In round 18 of the 2022 season, Longstaff scored two tries for Hull F.C. in their 34–28 victory over Hull Kingston Rovers at Magic Weekend.

England Knights
At the end of the 2021 season, he went on to make his England knights debut against Jamaica on the 15th October 2021.

References

External links
Warrington Wolves profile

2002 births
Living people
England Knights national rugby league team players
English rugby league players
Hull F.C. players
Newcastle Thunder players
Rugby league players from Pontefract
Rugby league second-rows
Warrington Wolves players